Aegle hedychroa is a moth of the family Noctuidae. It is found in Australia.

Hadeninae
Moths of Australia